Empress (sometimes stylized EMPRESS) is a video game cracker who specializes in breaking anti-piracy software. She has also released cracked games under the moniker C000005. 

Empress is known as one of the few crackers who can bypass Denuvo. Her motivation is to remove the software license aspect of digital games in an effort to preserve them after developers drop support. She also claims that removing digital rights management (DRM) decreases performance issues in a game.

Career
Empress became interested in the DRM-cracking scene in 2014. Her followers can select which game they want cracked by participating in the polls she posts. Her work is funded by crowdsourced donations. She uses the money to pay her living costs, upgrade hardware, and purchase games that she intends to crack. She acknowledges that accepting payment for piracy is against the etiquette of the warez scene.

Empress rose to prominence in 2019 after releasing a cracked version of Red Dead Redemption 2. She has cracked other high-profile games such as Mortal Kombat 11 and Anno 1800. In February 2021, Empress stated that she was arrested while working on the crack for Immortals Fenyx Rising. She blamed the repacker FitGirl, with whom she had a feud. However, that March, Empress was available to publish a workaround for the online check-in system of Battle.net.

In 2023, Empress was banned from Reddit. She released a cracked version of Hogwarts Legacy that February.

References

Hackers
Warez